PS-100 Karachi East-II is a constituency of the Provincial Assembly of Sindh.

General elections 2018

General elections 2013

See also
 PS-99 Karachi East-I
 PS-101 Karachi East-III

References

External links
 Election commission Pakistan's official website
 Official Website of Government of Sindh

Constituencies of Sindh